She-Guardian is a landscape sculpture by Russian sculptor Dashi Namdakov. It depicts a mythical winged creature standing guard over her young.

In May 2015, the monument was installed in the "City of Sculpture" temporary art space next to Cumberland Gate at London's Marble Arch. This was arranged by the Halcyon Gallery, with approval and consent of the Westminster Council. It remained there until 2016.

Some people say the sculpture exhibits an aggressive posture but Namdakov said: "I've never seen any threat in its open mouth. I recognized it as defense of the youth and protection of the family."

Production

The idea for the work  came to Dashi from a lynx skull, given to him by Siberian hunters. The statue was realized by an Italian famous foundry based in Pietrasanta: Fonderia d'arte Massimo del Chiaro.

References 

 Blog entry
 Halcyon Gallery web-site
 Russian 1TV channel news on unveiling of She Guardian (in Russian)

2015 sculptures
English contemporary works of art
Bronze sculptures in the City of Westminster
2015 in England
Statues in the City of Westminster